The Shadow Returns is a 1946 American comedy crime film directed by Phil Rosen and starring Kane Richmond, Barbara Read and Tom Dugan. It features the pulp character The Shadow, already a popular hero of novels and a radio show. It was the first in a series of three films released by Monogram in 1946 starring Richmond in the role.

Premise
Private detective Lamont Cranston steps in to solve a murder for the police with the assistance of his alter ego The Shadow.

Cast 
Kane Richmond as Lamont Cranston/The Shadow
Barbara Read as Margo Lane
Tom Dugan as Shrevvy
Joseph Crehan as Police Insp. Cardona
Pierre Watkin as Police Commissioner J.R. Weston
Robert Emmett Keane as Charles Frobay
Frank Reicher as Michael Hasdon
Lester Dorr as William Monk
Rebel Randall as Lenore Jessup
Emmett Vogan as Joseph Yomans, aka Paul Breck
Sherry Hall as Robert Buell
Cyril Delevanti as John Adams, the Butler

Reception 
The New York Times called The Shadow Returns "the first of three above-average Monogram features" but that the character Margo Lane, an intelligent and resourceful character on the radio series, was portrayed as a "blithering idiot" and that Margo came off "far stupider than the film's official comedy relief, Cranston's chauffeur Shrevvie". The Shadow Returns was thought to be "an entertaining mystery" and the disappearing gimmick considered "handled with subtlety and inventiveness" by director Phil Rosen.

Sequels 
The film was followed by two sequels, Behind the Mask (1946) and The Missing Lady (1946), with Kane Richmond and Barbara Read reprising their roles.

References

External links 

1946 films
1940s comedy mystery films
1940s crime comedy films
American crime comedy films
American comedy mystery films
Films directed by Phil Rosen
Monogram Pictures films
The Shadow films
American black-and-white films
1946 comedy films
1940s English-language films
1940s American films